The 820s decade ran from January 1, 820, to December 31, 829.

Significant people
 Louis the Pious
 Egbert of Wessex
 Michael II
 Thomas the Slav
 Omurtag of Bulgaria
 Al-Ma'mun

References